Malcolm Smith (born 1973) is a rock climber born in Dunbar, Scotland, who in 2002, won the bouldering IFSC Climbing World Cup.

Smith has also competed internationally in bouldering competitions, winning the 2002 IFSC Climbing World Cup.

When he was aged 18, he repeated Ben Moon's sport climbing route Hubble, at Raven Tor.

He is the brother of Scottish Visual Artist Sandy Smith.

Filmography
 Documentary on Smith's training techniques: 
 Documentary on Smith, Jerry Moffatt, and Ben Moon bouldering in Cresciano: 
 Documentary on British bouldering:

Notable Ascents 
First ascents unless otherwise stated.

Routes 
1991 Magnetic Fields, F8b, Malham Cove. Repeat.

1992 Hubble, F8c+, Raven Tor. Second ascent. Now sometimes considered F9a, which would make Malcolm the 3rd man ever to climb F9a.

1993 Steall Appeal, F8b, Steall Hut Crag.

1994 Transcendence, E8 6c, Back Bowden Doors. Malcolm originally gave the route E9 7a but it was downgraded by second ascendent Robin Barker also in 1994. It received its 3rd ascent in 2019.

2000 Transform, F8c,  Malham Cove.

2007 Black Out, F8c, The Anvil.

2007 The Smiddy, F8b+, The Anvil.

2008 Unjustified, F8c, Malham Cove. Repeat.

2010 Blood Diamond, F8c+, The Anvil.

2010 Hunger, F9a, The Anvil. Scotland’s first F9a.

Bouldering 
2001 Eight Ball, Font 8b, Gardoms Edge. Second or third ascent.

2001 Careless Torque, Font 8a+, Stanage Plantation. Second ascent.

2001 The Ace, Font 8b, Stanage Plantation. Second or third ascent.

2003 Lothlorian, Font 8b, Kyloe-in-the-woods.

2003 Leviathan, Font 8b+, Kyloe-in-the-woods.

2003 Monk Life, Font 8b+, Kyloe-in-the-woods.

2004 Pilgrimage, Font 8b+, Parisella's Cave.

2004 Dreamtime, Font 8c, Cresciano. Some give it Font 8b+.

2005 Supersize Me, Font 8b, Dumbarton Rock.

2007 The Serum of Sisyphus, Font 8a+, Dumbarton Rock.

2010 Gut buster, Font 8b+, Dumbarton Rock.

2010 Grande Tour, Font 8b, Dumbarton Rock.

2010 Firefight, Font 8b, Dumbarton Rock. Sent on same day as Grande Tour.

2010 Le Saboteur, Font 8a+, Dumbarton Rock.

2010 Perfect Crime Extension, Font 8a+, Dumbarton Rock.

See also
List of grade milestones in rock climbing
History of rock climbing
Rankings of most career IFSC gold medals

References

External links
 IFSC Profile
 

1973 births
People from Dunbar
Living people
Scottish rock climbers
British rock climbers
IFSC Climbing World Cup overall medalists
Boulder climbers